Hall is an architectural term which evolved from referring to a relatively large space enclosed by a roof and walls to multiple types of architectural spaces.  Hall can also mean:

Architectural spaces and related, broader meanings
 Hall (concept), for the development of the meaning of the word
  Hall, a name for a large house
 Great hall
 Hall and parlor house
 Hallway
 Mead hall

People with the name
 Hall (surname)

Places

Arctic
 Hall Island (Arctic), also known as Gallya, an island in the Franz Josef Land archipelago
 Hall Land, Greenland

Austria
 Bad Hall, a marketplace and spa of Austria, in Upper Austria
 Hall bei Admont, a municipality in Styria
 Hall in Tirol, a city in the state of Tyrol, Austria

Australia
 Hall, Australian Capital Territory

England
 Hall, Bishop's Tawton, Devon, an historic estate
 Hall, Lanteglos-by-Fowey, Cornwall, an historic estate
 Hall i' th' Wood, Bolton, Greater Manchester, a manor house and suburban area

Germany
 Schwäbisch Hall, formerly known as Hall, a town in Baden-Württemberg

Ireland
 Hall, County Westmeath, a townland in Kilcleagh civil parish, barony of Clonlonan, County Westmeath

Netherlands
Hall (Gelderland), a village in the Netherlands

Scotland
Hall, East Renfrewshire, a hamlet in East Renfrewshire

Sweden
Hall, Gotland, a socken and district on the Swedish island of Gotland

United States
 Hall, California (disambiguation)
Las Lomas, California, formerly Hall
 Hall, Indiana, an unincorporated place
 Hall, Montana
 Hall, New York 
 Hall, Washington
 Hall, West Virginia
 Hall County (disambiguation), several different counties
 Hall Island (Alaska)

Extraterrestrial
 Hall (lunar crater), on the Moon
 Hall, a crater on Phobos (moon)

Locomotives
 GWR 4900 Class, known as "Hall Class", a type of steam locomotive
 GWR 6959 Class, known as "Modified Hall Class", based on the Hall Class

Schools
 Hall High School (Arkansas), in Little Rock
 Hall High School (Connecticut), in West Hartford
 The Hall School, Hampstead, London, a boy's preparatory school

Other uses
 Hall effect, the production of a voltage difference (the Hall voltage) across an electrical conductor, named after Edwin Hall
 Hall of fame
 Hall Prison, a high-security prison near Södertälje, Sweden
 Hall theorem, also known as Hall's Marriage Theorem, a mathematical theorem named after Philip Hall
 Hall.com, a Hall, Inc. online enterprise communications platform
 USS Hall, various United States Navy ships
 hall echo or hall reverb, a form of acoustic reverberation
 Hall (film), a 2020 Canadian horror film

See also
 Halle (disambiguation)
 Halls (disambiguation)
 Justice Hall (disambiguation)